Kamala Sankaran is a legal academic, and from 2016, the vice-chancellor of Tamil Nadu National Law University. She has served as a member of the Working Group on Migration, set up by the Ministry of Housing and Urban Poverty Alleviation, Government of India; and on the Delhi High Court Legal Service Committee and the Delhi State Legal Services Authority.

Education 
Sankaran obtained an undergraduate degree in law (LLB) and masters in law (LLM) from the Faculty of Law, University of Delhi in 1982 and 1985, respectively. She obtained a PhD from the Faculty of Law, University of Delhi in 1999.

Academic career 
Sankaran has taught at the Faculty of Law, Jamia Milia Islamia, Indian Law Institute and Campus Law Centre, Faculty of Law, University of Delhi.

Selected publications 
 Sankaran, Kamala; Dupper, Ockert eds. (2014). Affirmative Action: A View from the Global South. Stellenbosch: Sun Press. .  
 Sankaran, Kamala; Fudge, Judy; McCrystal, Shae eds. (2012). Challenging the Legal Boundaries of Work Regulation. Oxford: Hart Publishing. .
 Sankaran, Kamala. (2009). Freedom of Association in India and International Labour Standards. Nagpur: LexisNexis. .

References 

Year of birth missing (living people)
Living people
Faculty of Law, University of Delhi alumni
Indian academic administrators
Indian legal scholars
Academic staff of Jamia Millia Islamia
Academic staff of Delhi University